Naiduwa is a small town in Sri Lanka. It is located within Southern Province. Its geographical coordinates are 6° 6' 0" North, 80° 10' 0" East.

Airports 
 Katukurunda Airport (approximately )
 Koggala Airport (approximately )
 Bentota River Airport (approximately )
 Ratmalana Airport (approximately )
 Kelani River-Peliyagoda Waterdrome (approximately )

See also
List of towns in Southern Province, Sri Lanka

External links

Naiduwa Map — Satellite Images of Naiduwa

Populated places in Southern Province, Sri Lanka